Stevens Creek is a stream in Ontario, Canada. It springs in the marshes of Marlborough Forest, flowing northeast to North Gower, where a smaller unnamed stream joins Stevens Creek from the north. It drains into the Rideau River in Kars at its most easterly point.

Stevens Creek was named for Roger Stevens, a United Empire Loyalist and British spy who drowned there in 1793.

See also
List of rivers of Ontario

References

Rivers of Ottawa